Avanza País may refer to:
 Go on Country, a Peruvian political party
 Avanza País, a Paraguayan political alliance